Glaucopsyche lycormas is a butterfly of the family Lycaenidae. It is found in the  East Palearctic in Siberia, Mongolia, China, Korea and Japan.

Subspecies
 Glaucopsyche lycormas lycormas (South Siberia (east of Ob), Russian Far East, Sakhalin, Mongolia, Northeast China, Korea, Japan)
 Glaucopsyche lycormas lederi O. Bang-Haas, 1907 (South Siberia, Kuznetsky Alatau, Salair, North Altai, East Sayan, Transbaikalia, Mongolia)
 Glaucopsyche lycormas scylla (Oberthür, 1880) (Amur, Ussuri)
 Glaucopsyche lycormas tomariana (Matsumura, 1928) (Kunashir, Kuriles)

References
Funet

lycormas
Butterflies described in 1866
Butterflies of Asia
Taxa named by Arthur Gardiner Butler